Dystopium is the fourth studio album released by the Swedish progressive metal band, Loch Vostok. The album was released worldwide on 23 September 2011. 
This album was produced by Teddy Möller, co-produced by Fredrik Klingwall and Lawrence Mackrory, recorded at Blueflame Productions, and mixed and mastered by Lawrence Mackrory at Great Scot! Audio.

Loch Vostok released a music video for the single Sacred Structure

Track listing

The iTunes version also included a bonus track called "Release".

Personnel
Teddy Möller – vocals, guitar
Niklas Kupper – guitar, vocals
Fredrik Klingwall – keyboard
Jimmy Mattsson – bass guitar
Lawrence Dinamarca – drums

References

External links

2011 albums
Loch Vostok albums